Stomopteryx detersella is a moth of the family Gelechiidae. It was described by Philipp Christoph Zeller in 1847. It is found in southern and eastern Europe, where it has been recorded from Portugal, Spain, France, Italy, Poland, Slovakia, Croatia, Albania, Bulgaria, Hungary, Romania, North Macedonia, Greece, Turkey, Russia and Ukraine, as well as on Sicily, Crete and the Canary Islands.

The wingspan is about 17 mm.

The larvae feed on Eryngium species. At first, the larvae mine the outer layers of the stem, but later bore the stem.

References

Moths described in 1847
Stomopteryx